Elisabeth Knechtl (born 21 June 1971) is an Austrian épée fencer. She earned a bronze medal at the 1991 Junior World Championships and a silver medal at the 1992 European Championships. She won the 1992–93 Fencing World Cup series by a single point over Switzerland's Gianna Bürki.

References
 Profile at the European Fencing Confederation

1971 births
Living people
Austrian female épée fencers
Sportspeople from Graz
Universiade medalists in fencing
Universiade bronze medalists for Austria